Al Green Is Love is the ninth album by soul singer Al Green. It was his final of six consecutive albums to hit number 1 on the R&B/Soul Albums chart, and it peaked into the Top 40 on the Pop Albums chart.

Track listing 
All tracks composed by Al Green; except where indicated
Side one
 "L-O-V-E (Love)"  (Green, Willie Mitchell, Mabon "Teenie" Hodges) – 3:09
 "Rhymes" (Green, Mabon "Teenie" Hodges) – 3:36
 "The Love Sermon" (Green, Willie Mitchell, Earl Randle) – 6:34
 "There Is Love" (Willie Mitchell, Lawrence Seymore, Yvonne Mitchell) – 3:04
 "Could I Be the One?" (Green, Willie Mitchell, Ann Mitchell) – 4:06

Side two
 "Love Ritual" – 4:19
 "I Didn't Know" – 7:46
 "Oh Me, Oh My (Dreams in My Arms)"  (Green, Willie Mitchell, Mabon "Teenie" Hodges) – 2:48
 "I Gotta Be More (Take Me Higher)" – 2:45
 "I Wish You Were Here" (Willie Mitchell) – 3:18

Personnel
Al Green - vocals
Larry Lee, Teenie Hodges - guitar
Leroy Hodges - bass
Charles Hodges - organ, piano
Howard Grimes - drums, congas
Conga Lou (Johnny Keyes) - congas
Archie Turner, Michael Allen - piano
Charles Chalmers, Donna Rhodes, Sandra Rhodes - backing vocals
Andrew Love, Lewis Collins - tenor saxophone
Wayne Jackson - trumpet
James Mitchell - baritone saxophone, string arrangements
Jack Hale - trombone
The Memphis Strings - strings

See also
List of Billboard number-one R&B albums of 1975

References

Further reading 
 Rolling Stone review

1975 albums
Al Green albums
Albums produced by Willie Mitchell (musician)
The Right Stuff Records albums
Hi Records albums